Dehors novembre is a Canadian animated short film, directed by Patrick Bouchard and released in 2005. Inspired in part by the suicide of Quebec rock musician Dédé Fortin, the film depicts various characters facing mortality in a bleak cityscape to the soundtrack of "Dehors novembre", a song by Fortin's band Les Colocs which was itself inspired by the prior death of Fortin's bandmate Patrick Esposito Di Napoli.

The film was a Genie Award nominee for Best Animated Short at the 26th Genie Awards in 2006, and won the Jutra Award for Best Animated Short at the 8th Jutra Awards the same year.

References

External links

2005 animated films
2005 films
2000s animated short films
Films directed by Patrick Bouchard
2005 short films
Canadian animated short films
2000s Canadian films
National Film Board of Canada animated short films
Best Animated Short Film Jutra and Iris Award winners